Hungaria FbC Roma was an Italian football club which was active in the early 1950s. Hungaria FbC Roma was made up entirely of Hungarian expatriate players, or players of Hungarian origin. The club didn't play in any official matches, and instead only participated in exhibition matches. However, despite this, it still managed to attract a number of international players. Hungaria disbanded while on tour in Colombia, leading to many of their players joining newly founded Unión Magdalena based in Santa Marta, a team that is currently playing in the Colombian top division, the Liga Águila.

Background
Hungarian players and coaches were extremely influential in Italian football.

Famous players
 Ferenc Nyers
 Nicolae Simatoc

References 

Defunct football clubs in Italy
Football clubs in Rome
Hungarian association football clubs outside Hungary
Hungarian diaspora in Italy